Martin Faust may refer to:

Martin Faust (actor) (1886–1943), American actor
Martin Faust (1901–1923), German bank clerk, one of the list of Nazis killed in the Beer Hall Putsch
Martin Faust (Texas politician), state senator, District 21, President pro tempore of the Texas Senate, 36th Legislature